Elections were held in Simcoe County, Ontario on October 25, 2010 in conjunction with municipal elections across the province.

Simcoe County Council
The county council consists of the mayors and deputy mayors of the municipalities.

Adjala-Tosorontio

Bradford West Gwillimbury

Clearview

Collingwood

Essa

Innisfil

Midland

New Tecumseth

Oro-Medonte

Penetanguishene

Ramara

Severn

Springwater

Tay

Tiny

Wasaga Beach

2010 Ontario municipal elections
Simcoe County